Egidio Boccanegra was the brother of Simone Boccanegra, the first Doge of Genoa.  In 1340 Egidio led a force of Genoese troops in the service of Alfonso XI of Castile in a war against Moroccan troops.  The following year, Peter IV of Aragon appointed Egidio his admiral.

Boccanegra was executed in Seville in 1367 because of his support for Henry II of Castile.

Sources
Steven Epstein. Genoa and the Genoese. p. 207

1367 deaths
14th-century Genoese people
14th-century executions
Genoese admirals
Boccanegra
Italian people executed abroad
People executed by Spain